The Member of Parliament for Ipswich in Suffolk, Jamie Cann, of the Labour Party died on 15 October 2001.

The by-election was held on 22 November that year, and was the first of six by-elections which took place during the 53rd Parliament (2001–05).

With Labour still basking in the glow of their landslide general election victory just five months earlier, no opposition party was able to mount an effective challenge. The Liberal Democrats improved their position somewhat but remained in third place, and the Labour candidate Chris Mole was returned with a majority of over 4,000 votes.

The declaration broke with tradition by using live computer images, club music and lasers after the result was announced.

Previous result

See also
Lists of United Kingdom by-elections

References

External links
British Parliamentary By Elections:  Campaign literature from the by-election

2001
2001 elections in the United Kingdom
2001 in England
2000s in Suffolk
November 2001 events in the United Kingdom
Ipswich